Ivan the Terrible is a children's novel by Anne Fine, published in 2007. It won the Nestlé Children's Book Prize Silver Award.

Plot
It is Ivan's first day of school. He can only speak Russian and it's Boris's job to look after him and translate for him. St Edmund's is a civilized school, but Ivan isn't civilized. Boris knows that he is going to have trouble teaching Ivan.

Reception
Chris Stephenson, of Carousel, reviewed the book saying "To work successfully, the book required a delicate balancing-act and Anne Fine, a consummate high-wire performer, doesn't put a foot wrong." Vanessa Curtis, of The Herald, reviewed the book saying ""Fine's writing is comic, her characters are well-drawn and there is a neat twist at the end..." Nicolette Jones, of Sunday Times, reviewed the book saying "...delightfully spiky... ...irreverent comedy..."

References

Novels by Anne Fine
2007 British novels
Novels set in schools
2007 children's books
Egmont Books books